Balanops balansae is a species of plant in the Balanopaceae family. It is endemic to New Caledonia.

References

Endemic flora of New Caledonia
balansae
Conservation dependent plants
Taxa named by Henri Ernest Baillon
Taxonomy articles created by Polbot